Deno Michael Mebrahtu (born 23 September 2002), known mononymously as Deno, is a British singer, songwriter, rapper and actor from London. His parents are originally from Eritrea, and he was raised in South London. He came to the forefront of London's afro-wave music scene beginning in 2018 with a number of viral music videos and hit songs.

Music career

Beginnings (2016–2017)
Deno attended Evelyn Grace Academy in Brixton, London.

In 2016, a friend of Deno asked him to freestyle and sing on his Snapchat after school. This was posted to Instagram with the "#imjustbait" hashtag. He gained thousands of followers. Further videos caught the attention of Stormzy, who retweeted one of them, got in touch, and took Deno into the studio with him to guest on his album Gang Signs & Prayer. 

In 2016, Deno met rapper AJ at a Stratford Westfield get-together. The two began a creative partnership, beginning with Deno singing the chorus on AJ's track "Know Me". The video netted over 2.5 million views on YouTube. The same year, the pair, often styled AJ x Deno, recorded multiple songs. They began performing more consistently, including opening for Migos at IndigO2.

Deno & AJ were signed by Sony Columbia UK in 2017. They released singles from 2017, but did not find commercial success until 2018 with the hit "London" featuring EO. The video for "London" was streamed over 45 million times and peaked at No. 45 on the UK Singles Chart.

Rise to fame (2018–2021)

Deno met rapper Cadet on the set of the short film Shiro's Story Part 3 (2018). His ensuing collaboration with Cadet, the track "Advice", went viral, with over 30 million YouTube views. It reached No. 14 on the UK Singles Chart with over 500,000 sales, earning a Brit certified Gold Award. More singles followed as he featured on the hit "Pumpy" by Da Beatfreakz, also featuring past collaborators AJ, Swarmz and Cadet. In 2019, Deno released "First Days", a tribute to Cadet, who had died in a road collision in February of that year.

In September 2019, Deno released the single "Change" featuring DigDat, with a video directed by Darnell Depradine.

He teamed with men's global fashion wear brand BoohooMAN for a 30-piece fashion collection, launched in September 2019.

Deno appeared singing in the 2018 season of Idris Elba's TV series In the Long Run.

In late 2019, Deno released the EP Eye 2 Eye which has features such as Krept, Jay1 and DigDat.

In 2021, Deno released the mixtape "Boy Meets World" which has features such as J.I the Prince of N.Y, Chunkz, Unknown T, Cadet, Craig David, DDG, Jade Silva and Bandokay and Double Lz of rap collective OFB. The mixtape peaked at 31 on the UK Albums Chart.

Discography

Mixtapes

Extended Plays

Singles

As lead artist

As Featured Artist

Guest appearances

Filmography

Television

Web

References

Living people
2002 births
21st-century Black British male singers
Singers from London
English people of Eritrean descent
People from Brixton
English hip hop musicians
Columbia Records artists